The common marbled carpet (Dysstroma truncata) is a moth of the family Geometridae. It is sometimes placed in the genus Chloroclysta. It is very common throughout the Palearctic region and the Near East. The species was first described by Johann Siegfried Hufnagel in 1767.

This is one of the most variable of the geometrids both in size (wingspan 32–39 mm) and colour. The basal and terminal areas of the forewings are marked with fascia separated by a large plain area in the middle, but the colouration of all these areas is confusingly variable from white to black with various grey, brown and reddish tones in between. The hindwings, though, are always pale grey marked with faint fascia. Some forms closely resemble Dysstroma citrata.  

One or two broods are produced each year and the adults can be seen in any month from May to November. The species flies at night and is attracted to light. It is also attracted to nectar-rich flowers and sugary foods which is fairly unusual for the family.

The larva is slender and green, usually with reddish stripes. It has been recorded feeding on a wide range of plants (see list below). The species overwinters as a larva.

  The flight season refers to the British Isles. This may vary in other parts of the range.

Recorded food plants 

Alnus - alder
Betula - birch
Crataegus - hawthorn
Fragaria - strawberry
Ligustrum - privet
Lonicera - honeysuckle
Prunus - bird cherry
Rosa - rose
Rubus - bramble
Rumex - dock
Salix - willow
Sorbus - rowan
Vaccinium
Parthenocissus quinquefolia - Virginia creeper

References 

Chinery, Michael Collins Guide to the Insects of Britain and Western Europe 1986 (Reprinted 1991)
Skinner, Bernard Colour Identification Guide to Moths of the British Isles 1984

External links 

Common marbled carpet at UKMoths
Lepiforum e.V.

Cidariini
Moths described in 1767
Geometrid moths of Great Britain
Moths of Europe
Moths of Asia
Taxa named by Johann Siegfried Hufnagel